The Crying Boy is a mass-produced print of a painting by Italian painter Giovanni Bragolin (1911–1981). This was the pen-name of the painter Bruno Amarillo. It was widely distributed from the 1950s onwards.

There are numerous alternative versions, all portraits of tearful young boys or girls. In addition to being widely known, certain urban legends attribute a 'curse' to the painting.

Curse
On 5 September 1985, the British tabloid newspaper The Sun reported that an Essex firefighter claimed that undamaged copies of the painting were frequently found amidst the ruins of burned houses. By the end of November, belief in the painting's curse was widespread enough that The Sun was organising mass bonfires of the paintings, sent in by readers.

Steve Punt, a British writer and comedian, investigated the curse in a BBC Radio 4 production called Punt PI. The conclusion reached by the programme, following testing at the Building Research Establishment, is that the prints were treated with a varnish containing fire retardant, and that the string holding the painting to the wall would be the first to deteriorate, resulting in the painting landing face down on the floor and thus being protected.

David Clarke, investigative journalist, says that stories naming the child as Don Bonillo or Diablo did not emerge until 2000 in a book by Tom Slemen.  They relate the child to several fires including the painter's studio. However, he says that "there is absolutely no truth whatsoever to any of that."

See also
 The Hands Resist Him, also known as The eBay Haunted Painting

References

Curses
Italian paintings
Urban legends
1950s works
1950s prints
Painting controversies